This is a list of public endorsements for declared candidates for the October 2022 leadership election for the Conservative Party of the United Kingdom.

Members of Parliament

Peers

Boris Johnson 
 The Lord Cruddas, banker and businessman

Jeremy Hunt 
 The Lord Desai, economist

Rishi Sunak 
 The Lord Ashcroft, deputy party chair (2005–2010)
 The Baroness Davidson of Lundin Links, leader of the Scottish Conservatives (2011–2019)
 The Lord Frost, Chief Brexit Negotiator (2019–2020)
 The Lord Hague of Richmond, Foreign Secretary (2010–2014) and party leader (1997–2001)
 The Lord Howard of Lympne, Home Secretary (1993-1997) and party leader (2003-2005)

Directly-elected mayors

Boris Johnson 
 Ben Houchen, Mayor of Tees Valley (2017–present)

Organisations

Jeremy Hunt 
 Bloomberg News

Individuals

Penny Mordaunt 
 Iain Dale, broadcaster (Independent)

Rishi Sunak 
 Piers Morgan, broadcaster

References 

2022 Conservative Party (UK) leadership elections
Political endorsements in the United Kingdom
Rishi Sunak